George Thresh was a professional rugby league footballer who played in the 1890s and 1900s. He played at club level for Wakefield Trinity (captain) (Heritage № 19), as a forward (prior to the specialist positions of), during the era of contested scrums.

Playing career
George Thresh made his début for Wakefield Trinity during September 1895, and he played his last match for Wakefield Trinity during December 1902.

References

External links

 Search for "Thresh" at rugbyleagueproject.org
Search for "George Thresh" at britishnewspaperarchive.co.uk

English rugby league players
Place of birth missing
Place of death missing
Rugby league forwards
Wakefield Trinity players
Year of birth missing
Year of death missing